Undefeated is the fifth studio album by Nashville-based singer-songwriter Bobby Bare Jr. The album was released in 2014, four years after his previous album, and has elements from multiple genres "alternating between indie rock, dream pop, bluegrass and country".

Reception 
 
Undefeated was met with highly positive reviews by critics. Multiple sources noted Bare's diverse and unique style on Undefeated and his previous albums, despite his father Bobby Bare having multiple country music hits, with  Exclaim! writer Matthew McKean saying that Bare "wasn't content to hitch a ride with his Country Music Hall of Fame father or the Nashville royalty around whom he grew up". Blurt Magazine writer John Moore gave the album 4 stars stating that "it’s simply confounding that Bare and his band aren’t as big as groups like Arcade Fire and My Morning Jacket". Hal Horowitz from American Songwriter stated that "just when you think you have a sense of Bobby Bare Jr.’s style, he up and changes it", though still thought the record was "occasionally too scattershot".

Track listing 
All music and lyrics by Bobby Bare Jr. except where noted.

Personnel 
 Bobby Bare Jr – vocals, guitar, songwriting
 Matt Rowland – keyboard
 Doni Schroader – drums
 Jordan Caress – bass
 David Vandervelde – guitar, bass
 Richie Kirkpatrick – guitar, bass
 Michael Grimes – bass
 Van Campbell – drums
 Hayes Carll – songwriting

External links 
 Lyrics to songs on Undefeated on Bobby Bare Jr's website
 Undefeated at Bloodshot Records
 Undefeated on Bandcamp

References 

Bobby Bare Jr. albums
2014 albums